Atlético Petróleos de Luanda, commonly known as Petro de Luanda, is an Angolan basketball club based in Luanda. It competes at the local level, at the Luanda Provincial Basketball Championship and at the Angola National Basketball Championship. Additionally, the club plays at the continental level, at the Basketball Africa League (BAL).

Established in 1976, the team is part of a multi-sports club which includes a football and handball team as well. Petro has been one of the most successful teams in Angola, having won the second most Angolan championships with 15, trailing only Primeiro de Agosto. The team has won two continental titles as well, having won the African Champions Cup in 2006 and 2015.

History
As the champions of the 2018–19 Angolan League, Petro qualified for the first season of the Basketball Africa League (BAL). In September 2020, Petro announced the signing of new head coach José Neto.

In the 2021–22 season, Petro won the triple crown; winning its 15th national title, the Angolan Cup and the Supercup. In all league games, Petro was unbeaten and had a 31–0 record including the playoffs.

Honours

Players

Current roster
The following is Petro de Luanda's roster for the 2022–23 season.

Notable players

Staff

Head coaches

Season by season

See also
Petro Atlético Football
Petro Atlético Handball
Petro Atlético Roller Hockey
BIC Basket
Federação Angolana de Basquetebol

References

External links
 
AfricaBasket profile
 Facebook profile
Sportstats profile

Basketball teams established in 1980
Sports clubs in Angola
Basketball teams in Angola
Basketball Africa League teams